French Ballet Class is a six-minute piece written by George Gershwin in 1937 for two pianos for the movie Shall We Dance. This sequence was meant to accompany a scene of dozens of  ballet dancers practicing their positions. It is written in the style of the galop.

Only two minutes of this music was used in the final film.

Compositions by George Gershwin
1937 compositions
Compositions for two pianos